Louise Fili (born April 12, 1951) is an American graphic designer recognized for use of typography and quality design. Her work often draws inspiration from her love of Italy, Modernism, and European Art Deco styles. Considered a leader in the postmodern return to historical styles in book jacket design, Fili explores historic typography combined with modern colors and compositions.

Beginning her career in the publishing industry, she became known for her strong typographic approach, designing nearly 2,000 book jackets during her time with Random House. Since opening her own design studio, her work specializes in restaurant identity, food-related logos, and packaging.

Early life 
Fili was born on April 12, 1951 in Orange, New Jersey to Italian immigrants, both schoolteachers. Fili has said that she was “interested in design before [she] even knew what it was” and as a child, carved letterforms into her walls, designed book covers, and created illuminated manuscripts of Bob Dylan lyrics. When she was 16, Fili taught herself calligraphy using a Speedball guide and an Osmiroid pen.

Education
Fili attended Skidmore College in Saratoga Springs, New York to study studio art. In 1973, she received a Bachelor of Science in studio art from Skidmore College, where she discovered her love for graphic design. Her senior project was an Italian hand-lettered cookbook. Fili moved to New York City in 1973, interning at the Museum of Modern Art and finishing the last semester of her degree at the School of Visual Arts.

Career
After graduating, Fili began her career as a freelance designer on special project books at Alfred A. Knopf from 1975-76. At 25, she was hired as a senior designer for Herb Lubalin, where she remained from 1976–78. She found type to be an expressive tool, which set the foundation for her later work.

In 1978, she joined Random House as the art director at Pantheon Books, where she eschewed standard fonts in favor of creating unique typographic treatments for each book jacket. Her approach extended to the physical surface treatment as well; Fili rejected the standard shiny finishes and foil-stamping on book jackets in favor of matte, laminated coatings which proved softer and more durable. "I was on a mission to prove that you didn’t have to shout to capture someone’s attention. The cover that I did for The Lover, by Marguerite Duras, was probably the best example of that." The success of her jacket for Marguerite Duras's bestseller, The Lover, in 1984 allowed her increased creative freedom at Pantheon. Fili designed close to 2000 books during her tenure at the publisher.

In 1989, she opened her own studio, Louise Fili Ltd, specializing in the design of restaurant identity, food-related logos, and packaging. She sought to "change the accepted formulas of food packaging" by pursuing designs that were quiet and subtle, believing that "one does not have to shout to be noticed." During that time, there were few female-run companies, so she knew naming the company after herself could be a liability. She embraced this by sending the message: "If you have a problem with my being female, then I don’t want you as a client.” She has designed identities for many New York City eateries such as Pearl Oyster Bar, Picholine, Artisanal, The Mermaid Inn, and Via Carota, and has created packaging for Sarabeth's jam, Tate's cookies, and Bella Cucina. Her geometric, often Cubist-like designs show an affinity to European Modernism, particularly the work of Lucian Bernhard, A.M. Cassandre, Jean Carlu, and Italian posters of the 1930s.

In 2014, Princeton Architectural Press published Grafica della Strada, a compilation of her Italian sign photographs. This was followed in 2015 by Graphique de la Rue: The Signs of Paris.

Fili has authored and co-authored over twenty books, many of them with her husband, the design historian Steven Heller. A monograph of her work, Elegantissima, was published in 2012.

In 2009, she redesigned the Good Housekeeping Seal of Approval for its 100th anniversary.

In 2000, she received three James Beard Award nominations, and since 1998, she has been an elected member of the Alliance Graphique Internationale. In 2004, Fili was inducted into the Art Directors Club Hall of Fame. In 2015, she received the medal of lifetime achievement from the Type Directors Club. In 2021, she was recognized for her contributions to typography with the Frederic W. Goudy Award, one of the highest honors in the field of typography.

For over twenty years, Fili has taught at School of Visual Arts, in both the undergraduate and graduate programs as well as the SVA Masters Workshop in Rome every summer. She has also taught at the New School, New York University and Cooper Union.

Books authored and co-authored
 Italian Art Deco: Graphic Design Between the Wars, San Francisco: Chronicle Books, 1993 (With Steven Heller) 
 Dutch Moderne: Graphic Design from De Stijl to Deco, San Francisco: Chronicle Books, 1994 (With Steven Heller) 
 Streamline: American Art Deco Graphic Design, San Francisco: Chronicle Books, 1995 (With Steven Heller) 
 Cover Story: The Art of American Magazine Covers 1900–1950, San Francisco: Chronicle Books (San Francisco, California), 1996 (With Steven Heller) 
 Logos A to Z (self-published) 1997
 British Modern: Graphic Design Between the Wars, San Francisco: Chronicle Books, 1998 (With Steven Heller) 
 German Modern: Graphic Design from Wilhelm to Weimar, San Francisco: Chronicle Books, 1998 (With Steven Heller) 
 Typology: Type Design from the Victorian Era to the Digital Age, San Francisco: Chronicle Books, 1999 (With Steven Heller) 
 More Logos A to Z (self-published) 1999.
 Design Connoiseur: An Eclectic Collection of Imagery and Type, New York: Allworth Press, 2000 (With Steven Heller) 
 Counter Culture: The Allure of Mini-mannequins, New York: Princeton Architectural Press, 2001 (With Steven Heller) 
 Logos A to Z Three, 2002 (self-published)
 Euro Deco: Graphic Design Between the Wars, San Francisco: Chronicle Books, 2004 (With Steven Heller) 
 A Designer’s Guide to Italy. (self-published) 2004.
 Stylepedia: A Guide to Graphic Design Mannerisms, Quirks, and Conceits, San Francisco: Chronicle Books, 2006 (With Steven Heller) 
 The Civilized Shopper’s Guide to Florence, New York: The Little Bookroom, 2007.
 Italianissimo: The Quintessential Guide to What Italians Do Best, New York: The Little Bookroom, 2008 (With Lise Apatoff)
 Scripts: Elegant Lettering from Design’s Golden Age, London: Thames and Hudson, 2011 (With Steven Heller) 
 Elegantissima: The Design and Typography of Louise Fili, New York: Princeton Architectural Press, 2012
 "Shadow Type: Classic Three-Dimensional Lettering", London: Thames and Hudson, 2013 (With Steven Heller) 
 Grafica della Strada, Princeton Architectural Press, 2014
 The Cognoscenti's Guide to Florence, Princeton Architectural Press, 2015
 "Stencil Type", London: Thames and Hudson, 2015 (With Steven Heller) 
 Graphique de la Rue, Princeton Architectural Press, 2015
 Slab Serif Type', London: Thames and Hudson, 2016 (With Steven Heller)
 The Cognoscenti's Guide to Florence: Shop and Eat Like a Florentine, Revised Edition, Princeton Architectural Press, 2017
 Grafica de les Rambles: The Signs of Barcelona, Princeton Architectural Press, 2017

Typefaces 
 Mardell, an Italian Futurist-inspired typeface designed for the Hamilton Wood Type Museum and made as both a digital font and as wood type.
 Montecatini, inspired by the Stile Liberty travel posters of Italy in the early 1900s.
 Marseille, an Art Deco-inspired typeface with a distinctive flair that exudes La Belle France.

Honors
James Beard Foundation Award, Outstanding Restaurant Graphics, Nominee (1998,1999, 2000)
Art Directors Club Hall of Fame, inducted 2004
Gold Medal, Art Directors Club
Silver Medal, Art Directors Club
Gold Medal, Society of Illustrators
Premio Grafico, Bologna Book Fair
National Endowment for the Arts grant (with Steven Heller)
AIGA Medal, 2014
Type Directors Club Medal of Excellence, 2015
SVA Master Series Award and Exhibition, 2016

Permanent collections
Fili's work is held in the following permanent collections:
 Library of Congress
 Smithsonian Cooper-Hewitt, National Design Museum
 Bibliothèque nationale

References

Further reading
 
 
 Kirkham, Pat (2000). Women Designers in the USA, 1900-2000: Diversity and Difference. New Haven and London: Yale University Press. p. 367. .

External links

American graphic designers
Women graphic designers
AIGA medalists
1951 births
Living people